As the Light Goes Out is a 2014 Hong Kong-Chinese disaster film directed by Derek Kwok and starring Nicholas Tse, Shawn Yue, Simon Yam and Hu Jun.

Cast
 Nicholas Tse as Sam Ho Wing-sam (何永森)
 Shawn Yue as Yau Pong-chiu (游邦潮)
 Simon Yam as Lee Pui-to (李培道)
 Hu Jun as Hai Yang (海洋)
 Michelle Bai as Yang Lin (楊琳)
 William Chan as Cheung Man-kin (張文健)
 Andy On as Yip Chi-fai (葉志輝)
 Patrick Tam as Mr. Man (萬先生)
 Liu Kai-chi as Tam Sir (譚Sir)
 Deep Ng as Ben Sir (斌Sir)
 Michelle Wai as Power plant employee
 Kenny Kwan as Siu-kiu (小僑)
 Alice Li as Emily
 Jackie Chan as himself (cameo)
 Andrew Lau as Director of Fire Services (cameo)
 Siu Yam-yam as Wife of wine brewer owner (cameo)

Release
As the Light Goes Out was released in Hong Kong on January 2, 2014 and in China on January 3, 2014. At the end of the run, the film has grossed $11.92 million in China.

Reception
Derek Elley of Film Business Asia gave the film a six out of ten rating, stating that the film "lacks human drama and real scope" and that "isn't especially bad as a genre movie, it's also not especially good, and is certainly no threat to Johnnie To's Lifeline (1997) as the premier Hong Kong firefighting film."

Awards and nominations

References

External links
 
 

2014 films
Hong Kong disaster films
Films directed by Derek Kwok
2010s Cantonese-language films
2010s Mandarin-language films
Chinese disaster films
Chinese action films
Films about firefighting
Media Asia films
Films set in Hong Kong
Films shot in Hong Kong
2010s Hong Kong films